The men's individual competition at the 2001 World Games in Akita was played from 17 to 18 August. The aerobic gymnastics competition took place at Akita City Gymnasium.

Competition format
A total of 7 athletes entered the competition. Only final was held.

Results

References

External links
 Results on IWGA website

Men's individual